The Liberty Point Resolves, also known as "The Cumberland Association", was a resolution signed by fifty residents of Cumberland County, North Carolina, early in the American Revolution.

On June 20, 1775, these Patriots, who had formed themselves into a group known simply as "The Association", met at Lewis Barge's tavern in Cross Creek (now part of Fayetteville) to sign a document protesting the actions of Great Britain following the battles of Lexington and Concord. The signers expressed the hope that Great Britain and the colonies would be reconciled, but vowed that, if necessary, they would "go forth and be ready to sacrifice our lives and fortunes to secure her freedom and safety". The resolves were thus not a declaration of independence—public advocation for separation from Great Britain would not become common until 1776.

The period of the American Revolution was a time of divided loyalties in Cumberland County, and a considerable portion of the population, especially the Highland Scots who had immigrated in 1739, were staunchly loyal to the British Crown. Among them was the famous Scottish heroine Flora MacDonald. The Liberty Point document followed the similar Mecklenburg Resolutions by just a month and preceded the United States Declaration of Independence by a little more than a year.

Text

The brief document read:

Robert Rowan, who apparently organized the group, signed first. The names of other signers include those of families who made a deep imprint on the Cape Fear region, from colonial times onward: Barge, Powell, Evans, Elwell, Green, Carver, Council, Gee, Blocker, Hollingsworth. The event is commemorated today by a memorial and plaque in downtown Fayetteville, near the corner of Bow and Person Streets.

Signers
  
Robert Rowan
Peter Messer
Sam. Hollingsworth
Maurice Nowlan
Thomas Cabein
John Glendenin
Theophilus Evans
Daniel Douse
William Carver
Joseph DE Lespine
James Dick
James Edmunds
John Oliver
John Stephenson
John Carraway
Micajah Terrell
William Bathgate
William Herin
 
John Wilson
Charles Stevens
David Evans
Thomas Rae
John Parker
James Gee
James Emmitt
Walter Murray
Benjamin Elwell
Aaron Varden
William Gillespie
William White
Oners West
Philip Herin
Joseph Greer
George Fletcher
Robert Varner
Thomas White
 
James Pearl
John Elwell
John Jones
Lewis Barge
David Dunn
Robert Council
Martin Leonard
Simon Bandy
James Giffy
Thomas Moody
Robert Greer
Robert Carver
Arthur Council
Joshua Hadley
Samuel Carver
David Shephard
William Blocker
George Barnes

References
"Association adopted and signed by the Committees of the District of Wilmington, in North-Carolina". American Archives Series 4, Volume 2, p. 1030, published online by the Northern Illinois University Libraries.
"Liberty Point Resolves return to Fayetteville". The Fayetteville Observer, July 22, 2008. Accessed on August 3, 2008.

Cumberland County, North Carolina
North Carolina in the American Revolution
1775 in the Thirteen Colonies
Documents of the American Revolution
United States documents
1775 in North Carolina
1775 documents